Catocala remissa is a moth of the family Erebidae first described by Otto Staudinger in 1892. It is found in Turkmenistan and Kazakhstan.

References

Moths described in 1892
remissa
Moths of Asia